Karakelong is the main island of the Talaud Islands north east of Sulawesi, Indonesia. It has a population of 51,506 at the 2010 Census and 59,920 at the 2020 Census. Its largest town is Melonguane on the west coast, which serves as the administrative centre for the Talaud Islands Regency.

References

Islands of Sulawesi
Landforms of North Sulawesi